Isaac Mercer may refer to:

 Isaac Mercer (1910–2002), Newfoundland lawyer and politician
 Isaac Mercer (Bay de Verde), who represented Bay de Verde in the Newfoundland assembly from 1902 to 1904
 Isaac Mercer (died 1860), whose murder led to a ban on the practice of mummering in Newfoundland